The Junior men's race at the 1973 IAAF World Cross Country Championships was held in Waregem, Belgium, at the Hippodroom Waregem on March 17, 1973.   A report on the event was given in the Glasgow Herald.

Complete results, medallists, 
 and the results of British athletes were published.

Race results

Junior men's race (7 km)

Individual

Teams

Note: Athletes in parenthesis did not score for their team

Participation
An unofficial count yields the participation of 55 athletes from 12 countries in the Junior men's race.  This is in agreement with the official numbers as published.

 (5)
 (5)
 (5)
 (5)
 (5)
 (5)
 (4)
 (4)
 (5)
 (5)
 (4)
 (3)

See also
 1973 IAAF World Cross Country Championships – Senior men's race
 1973 IAAF World Cross Country Championships – Senior women's race

References

Junior men's race at the World Athletics Cross Country Championships
IAAF World Cross Country Championships
1973 in youth sport